Keshayeh (also Romanized as Keshāyeh) is a village in Siyarastaq Yeylaq Rural District, Rahimabad District, Rudsar County, Gilan Province, Iran. At the 2006 census, its population was 82, in 24 families.

References 

Populated places in Rudsar County